Cadlina is a genus of sea slugs, dorid nudibranchs, shell-less marine gastropod mollusks historically classified in the family Chromodorididae. Recent research by R.F. Johnson in 2011 has shown that Cadlina does not belong to the family Chromodorididae. She has therefore brought back the name Cadlinidae from synonymy with Chromodorididae. The family Cadlinidae also includes the genus Aldisa Bergh, 1878.

Species 
Species in the genus Cadlina include:
 Cadlina abyssicola Valdés, 2001
 Cadlina affinis Odhner, 1934 
 Cadlina dubia Edmunds, 1981 
 Cadlina excavata  (Pruvot-Fol, 1951) 
 Cadlina flavomaculata MacFarland, 1905 - Yellow-spot cadlina
 Cadlina georgiensis Schrödl, 2000
 Cadlina glabra Friele and Hansen, 1876
 Cadlina jannanicholsae Korshunova, Fletcher, Picton, Lundin, Kashio, N. Sanamyan, K. Sanamyan, Padula, Schrödl & Martynov, 2020 sp. nov.
 Cadlina japonica  Baba, 1937
 Cadlina kamchatica  Korshuniva et al. in Martynov et al., 2015
 Cadlina kerguelensis  Thiele, 1912
 Cadlina klasmalmbergi Korshunova, Fletcher, Picton, Lundin, Kashio, N. Sanamyan, K. Sanamyan, Padula, Schrödl & Martynov, 2020 sp. nov.
 Cadlina laevis (Linnaeus, 1767) - White Atlantic cadlina type species
 Cadlina limbaughorum Lance, 1962
 Cadlina luarna (Er. Marcus & Ev. Marcus, 1967)
 Cadlina luteomarginata MacFarland, 1905 - Yellow-edged cadlina
 Cadlina magellanica  Odhner, 1926 
 Cadlina modesta MacFarland, 1966 - Modest cadlina
 Cadlina nigrobranchiata  Rudman, 1985 
 Cadlina olgae Chichvarkhin, 2016
 Cadlina pacifica Bergh, 1879
 Cadlina paninae Korshunova, Fletcher, Picton, Lundin, Kashio, N. Sanamyan, K. Sanamyan, Padula, Schrödl & Martynov, 2020 sp. nov.
 Cadlina pellucida  (Risso, 1826) 
 Cadlina rumia Er. Marcus, 1955
 Cadlina scabriuscula (Bergh, 1890)
 Cadlina sp. 1 saddled nudibranch
 Cadlina sp. 2 brown-dotted nudibranch
 Cadlina sparsa (Odhner, 1921) - Dark-spot cadlina
 Cadlina sylviaearleae Korshunova, Fletcher, Picton, Lundin, Kashio, N. Sanamyan, K. Sanamyan, Padula, Schrödl & Martynov, 2020 sp. nov.
 Cadlina tasmanica Rudman, 1990
 Cadlina umiushi  Korshuniva et al. in Martynov et al., 2015
 Cadlina willani Miller, 1980

Species brought into synonymy 
 Cadlina berghi  Odhner, 1926  : synonym of Cadlina sparsa (Odhner, 1921)
 Cadlina burnayi  Ortea, 1988  : synonym of Tyrinna burnayi (Ortea, 1988)
 Cadlina evelinae   Marcus, 1958  : synonym of Tyrinna evelinae (Er. Marcus, 1958)
 Cadlina falklandica  Odhner, 1926  : synonym of Cadlina magellanica Odhner, 1926
 Cadlina laevigata  Odhner, 1926  : synonym of Cadlina sparsa (Odhner, 1921)
 Cadlina marginata MacFarland, 1905 - Yellow-edged cadlina : synonym of Cadlina luteomarginata McFarland, 1966
 Cadlina ornatissima  Risbec, 1928  : synonym of Cadlinella ornatissima (Risbec, 1928)

References

Further reading 
 Rudman W.B. (1984) The Chromodorididae (Opisthobranchia: Mollusca) of the Indo-West Pacific: a review of the genera. Zoological Journal of the Linnean Society 81 (2/3): 115-273. page(s): 233
 Vaught, K.C. (1989). A classification of the living Mollusca. American Malacologists: Melbourne, FL (USA). . XII, 195 pp
 Gofas, S.; Le Renard, J.; Bouchet, P. (2001). Mollusca, in: Costello, M.J. et al. (Ed.) (2001). European register of marine species: a check-list of the marine species in Europe and a bibliography of guides to their identification. Collection Patrimoines Naturels, 50: pp. 180–213.

External links 

 
The Seaslug Forum : species list
 Systematic list of Ophistobranchia

 
Gastropod genera